Castle of Frankenstein was an American horror, science fiction and fantasy film magazine, published between 1962 and 1975 by Calvin Thomas Beck's Gothic Castle Publishing Company, distributed by Kable News. Larry Ivie—who also was cover artist for several early issues—and Ken Beale edited the first three issues. Writer-artist Bhob Stewart edited the magazine from 1963 into the early 1970s. Although promoted and sold as a "monster magazine," readers were aware that Castle of Frankenstein, at the time, was the only nationally distributed magazine devoted to a legitimate and serious coverage of B movies. In addition to its central focus on classic and current horror films, Castle of Frankenstein also devoted pages to amateur filmmakers and fanzines. Its advertising pages sold full-length silent feature films such as The Lost World and The Golem: How He Came into the World.

Following employment as an editor for publisher Joe Weider, Calvin Beck (1929–1989) entered the monster magazine arena in 1959 with his one-shot issue Journal of Frankenstein, which featured John Zacherle on the cover and had a small circulation. As an experiment, Beck printed part of the run on slick paper. After a hiatus and a title change, Beck returned with Castle of Frankenstein #1 in 1962.

Beck claimed that since his magazine carried no outside advertising, a standardized schedule was unneeded. Issues were published whenever they were completed, leading to an erratic, irregular schedule. Distribution also varied; while many well-stocked periodical outlets did not carry the magazine, some less-likely outlets (such as grocery stores) did.

The magazine ran 25 issues, plus one annual (the 1967 Fearbook); the final issue was published in 1975. Beck cancelled his magazine not because of poor sales, but to devote his energy to writing books. During its primary run, Castle of Frankenstein outlasted the majority of monster magazines that filled the market for two decades, with the notable exception of Famous Monsters of Filmland.

In 1999, publisher Dennis Druktenis revived both Castle of Frankenstein (releasing 10 more issues) and the original title Journal of Frankenstein (releasing five more issues).

In 2021, publishers Don and Vicki Smeraldi once again revived "Castle of Frankenstein," issuing #36 in October, with plans to release new issues twice a year every spring and fall.

Contributors
In addition to book reviews by Charles Collins and Lin Carter, contributors included Barry Brown, Richard A. Lupoff and William K. Everson.

Inspired by the ratings and reviews of films in Cahiers du Cinéma, Stewart introduced a similar system with the "Comic Book Council", the first critical coverage of comic books to appear in a national magazine. Commentary and ratings of underground comics were juxtaposed with reviews of mainstream comics. Another key feature was the "Frankenstein Movieguide", an attempt to document all fantastic films seen on television with "mini-reviews" written by Joe Dante and Stewart. Unlike some genre commentators, these reviewers were not limited only to monster-style films. Instead, the many brief, tightly-written fantasy film reviews also covered experimental and foreign art films. The capsule review format enforced a brevity and economy that inspired many younger writers.

With new art and reprints of vintage fantasy art, the magazine published such artists as Aubrey Beardsley, Hannes Bok, Harry Clarke, Virgil Finlay, Jim Steranko, Wally Wood and Weird Tales illustrator Matt Fox. To cut costs, color photos rather than paintings were used on the covers of issues six through 14. With issue 11's cover photo of Leonard Nimoy, Castle of Frankenstein was the first magazine to feature Star Trek as a major cover story. Other issues displayed cover paintings by Robert Adragna, Marcus Boas, Bok, Frank Brunner, Maelo Cintron, Larry Ivie, Russ Jones, Ken Kelly, Los Angeles painter Tom Maher and Lee Wanagiel.

Interior art included graphic stories by Ivie, Brunner, Bernie Wrightson and the team of Marv Wolfman and Len Wein, plus the first published comics page by Marvel artist-writer-editor Larry Hama. Castle of Frankenstein also carried an unusual original comic strip, Baron von Bungle by Richard Bojarski, which gave a humorous twist to the world depicted in Universal horror films.

Books

Beck, with an editorial assist by fantasy fiction scholar Haywood P. Norton, assembled the paperback anthology, The Frankenstein Reader (Ballantine Books, 1962). The two brought together a roster of vintage horror-fantasy tales by E. F. Benson, Ambrose Bierce, Robert W. Chambers, Ralph Adams Cram, Charles Dickens, Amelia B. Edwards, Katharine Fullerton Gerould, Richard Middleton, Sir Arthur Quiller-Couch, Robert Louis Stevenson and H. G. Wells.

In Heroes of the Horrors (Macmillan, 1975), Beck wrote illustrated biographies of six leading horror film stars (Lon Chaney, Sr., Lon Chaney, Jr., Boris Karloff, Peter Lorre, Bela Lugosi, Vincent Price) and writers such as Robert Bloch and Richard Matheson. The book reworked information previously unearthed for Castle of Frankenstein articles.

Bhob Stewart and Beck then collaborated on a companion volume, Scream Queens: Heroines of the Horrors (Macmillan, 1978), illustrated biographical profiles of 29 fantasy film actresses and directors. The book included an article by actor Barry Brown, plus research by Drew Simels, author of the TV movie entries in early editions of Leonard Maltin's Movie Guide series. With articles on Alice Guy-Blaché, Joan Crawford, Bette Davis, Veronica Lake, Elsa Lanchester, Agnes Moorehead, Mary Philbin, Barbara Steele, Vampira, Fay Wray and others, Scream Queens also incorporated material from the Castle of Frankenstein files of manuscripts and still photographs.

Beck's fourth book, Sense of Wonder, about fantasy films of the 1940s, was never published.

See also
 Science fiction magazine
 Fantasy fiction magazine
 Horror fiction magazine

References

External links
 Castle of Frankenstein history and cover gallery
 Gallery of CoF covers 
 Profile of Calvin Beck and his alleged connection to Robert Bloch's Psycho
 Archived Castle of Frankenstein magazines on the Internet Archive

Film magazines published in the United States
Speculative fiction magazines published in the United States
Defunct science fiction magazines published in the United States
Magazines established in 1962
Magazines disestablished in 1975
Magazines published in New Jersey